The Machlyes were a legendary ancient Libyan tribe.

Ancient sources 
According to Herodotus, their young women held a ritual battle with sticks and stones annually with neighboring Auseans. Those who died of their wounds were said to have lied about their virginity.

Pliny the Elder claimed they were hermaphrodites that had a male half and a female half, possibly inspired by the martial practices of the females.

In fiction 
In the book Sweet Shadows by Tera Lynn Childs, the machlyes Achilla saves Gretchen from the merdaemon in the abysses.

References 

Ancient Libya
Tribes described primarily by Herodotus
Legendary Greek people
Androgynous and hermaphroditic deities
Legendary tribes in Greco-Roman historiography